The 1989 Cork Intermediate Hurling Championship was the 80th staging of the Cork Intermediate Hurling Championship since its establishment by the Cork County Board in 1909. The draw for the opening fixtures took place on 18 December 1988. The championship began on 27 May 1989 – 1 October 1989.

On 1 October 1989, Valley Rovers won the championship following a 6-12 to 3-05 defeat of Kilbrittain in the final at Páirc Uí Chaoimh. This was their first ever championship title.

Valley Rovers' John Shiels was the championship's top scorer with 3-22.

Results

First round

Second round

Quarter-finals

Semi-finals

Final

Championship statistics

Top scorers

Overall

In a single game

References

Cork Intermediate Hurling Championship
Cork Intermediate Hurling Championship